Hotel Yancey or The Hotel Yancey may refer to:

Hotel Yancey (North Platte, Nebraska), listed on the NRHP in Lincoln County, Nebraska
The Hotel Yancey (Grand Island, Nebraska), also NRHP-listed

See also
Yancey's Tavern, Kingsport, Tennessee, listed on the NRHP in Tennessee